SP-54 is a highway in the northeastern part of the state of São Paulo in Brazil.  The highway is known as the João Batista de Mello Souza for its entire length. The highway runs from the city of the Rodovia Presidente Dutra (BR-116) up to the state boundary with Rio de Janeiro.

References 

Highways in São Paulo (state)